San Pietro is a Neoclassical-style, Roman Catholic church located in Nepi, province of Viterbo, region of Lazio, Italy. 
A church likely stood here by the 13th century. A new building was consecrated in 1465 and officiated by the Augustinian order. However in the 18th century, the town underwent a renewed urban plan, and the axis of the church was changed from East-West to North-South. Work on refurbishment began in 1755, and led to the present elliptical layout. The interior has a rich stucco decoration.

References

Churches in the province of Viterbo
Neoclassical architecture in Lazio
18th-century Roman Catholic church buildings in Italy
Neoclassical church buildings in Italy